Emmanuelle Boidron (born 4 August 1978, in Orléans, Loiret, France), is a French actress. Her most important appearance is in the Navarro TV series as Yolande Navarro.

Filmography

External links

1978 births
Living people
Actors from Orléans
French film actresses
French television actresses